The Very Best of Macy Gray is the first greatest hits album by American singer and songwriter Macy Gray. It was released on August 30, 2004, by Epic Records. It contains all singles from Gray's first three studio albums, as well as two previously unreleased tracks (the single "Love Is Gonna Get You" and a cover of Aerosmith's 1975 song "Walk This Way"), three album tracks, three remixes, and the 2000 single "Demons", a collaboration with Fatboy Slim. The album peaked at number 36 on the UK Albums Chart and charted moderately in other European countries.

On December 1, 2008, the album was reissued in the United Kingdom including "Winter Wonderland", which first appeared as a B-side to "Sexual Revolution" and was featured in the Marks & Spencer Christmas ads. A few weeks later, the song reached number 76 on the UK Singles Chart.

Track listing

Notes
  signifies a co-producer
  signifies a vocal producer
  signifies a remixer

Sample credits
 "Do Something" contains a sample of "Git Up, Git Out" by OutKast and "Funky for You" by Nice & Smooth.
 "I've Committed Murder" contains a sample of "Live Right Now" by Eddie Harris and an interpolation of "(Where Do I Begin?) Love Story" by Francis Lai & His Orchestra.
 "Demons" contains a sample of "I Can't Write Left-Handed" by Bill Withers.

Charts

Release history

Notes

References

2004 greatest hits albums
Albums produced by Dallas Austin
Albums produced by Mike Elizondo
Epic Records compilation albums
Macy Gray albums
Albums recorded at Capitol Studios
Neo soul compilation albums